Serebrovo is a rural locality (a village) in Bryzgalovskoye Rural Settlement, Kameshkovsky District, Vladimir Oblast, Russia. The population was 96 as of 2010.

Geography 
Serebrovo is located 17 km northeast of Kameshkovo (the district's administrative centre) by road. Imeni Kirova is the nearest rural locality.

References 

Rural localities in Kameshkovsky District